The 2015–16 Biathlon World Cup – Pursuit Men started on Thursday December 3, 2015 in Östersund and will finish in March 2016 in Khanty-Mansiysk. The defending titlist is Martin Fourcade of France.

Competition format
The  pursuit race is skied over five laps. The biathlete shoots four times at any shooting lane, in the order of prone, prone, standing, standing, totalling 20 targets. For each missed target a biathlete has to run a penalty loop. Competitors' starts are staggered, according to the result of the previous sprint race.

2014–15 Top 3 Standings

Medal winners

Standings

References

Pursuit Men